The RK 21 is an American trailerable sailboat that was designed by Peter Barrett as a cruiser and first built in 1972.

Production
The design was built by RK Industries, a subsidiary of Coastal Recreation, Inc, in the United States. It was built starting in 1972, but it is now out of production.

Design
The RK 21 is a recreational keelboat, built predominantly of fiberglass. It has a masthead sloop rig; a spooned, raked stem; a slightly angled transom; a transom-hung rudder controlled by a tiller and a swing keel. The design displaces  and carries  of ballast.

The boat is normally fitted with a small outboard motor for docking and maneuvering.

The design has sleeping accommodation for two people, with two straight settee berths in the main cabin.

See also
List of sailing boat types

References

Keelboats
1970s sailboat type designs
Sailing yachts
Trailer sailers
Sailboat type designs by Peter Barrett
Sailboat types built by Coastal Recreation, Inc